Immigration Voice is a 501(c)(4) nonprofit organization that claims to work to alleviate problems faced by high-skilled foreign workers in the United States, but has mostly advocated for the Fairness for High Skilled Immigrants Act that benefits Indian employment-based immigration applicants. Some of the problems that Immigration Voice claims to work on include delays due to visa number unavailability for certain employment-based categories, delays due to United States Citizenship and Immigration Services processing backlogs, and delays due to Labor Certification Application backlogs. Immigration Voice works to remove these and other regulations by supporting changes to immigration law for high-skilled legal employment-based immigrants.

Neil Patel, co-founder of the conservative The Daily Caller and Robert Hoffman, a longtime tech executive and lobbyist, sit on the advisory board of Immigration Voice.

History 
Immigration Voice is a 501(c)(4) non-profit organization that claims to help immigrants and legislative and executive branches of government, solving problems in the employment-based immigration process due to delays, USCIS processing, and Labor Certification. Immigration Voice's stated purpose is to improve immigration laws and employment where high-skilled immigrants can enter into the United States economy easier and faster, but it has mostly advocate for legislation that benefits Indian employment-based immigration applicants. Immigration Voice is known as a national organization of legal, majority Indian high-skilled immigrants living in the United States. The organization has almost 100,000 members all around the country and represents the interests of the nearly one million immigrants and their family members, the overwhelming majority from India, stuck in green card backlogs.

Goals and accomplishments 
On March 3 and March 4, 2014, Immigration Voice members held over 300 meetings with lawmakers and congressional staff over two days. Participants advocated for action on immigration that year and a greater focus on stopping the green card backlogs faced by employment-based immigrants. Immigration Voice's primary goal is to reduce delays with green cards for Indian high-skilled immigrants in order to work legally within the United States. Currently, the green card system takes about 12 years before an Indian high-skilled national may be granted permanent residence.

One of the biggest accomplishments for Immigration Voice was being involved in the movement of the DREAM Act. The DREAM Act was first suggested in 2001 and has recently been reintroduced in the United States Senate. The Act would allow conditional residency to students who are illegal aliens, arrived in the U.S. as minors, graduated from U.S. high schools and lived in the country for five or more years, prior to the bill's enactment. California has embraced a version of the DREAM Act that would allow illegal alien children living in the United States to be given private college scholarships to state schools.

On May 8, 2014, the U.S. Department of Homeland Security announced proposed regulations that will allow dependent spouses of certain principal workers to be able to request employment authorization. The current rules are stopping thousands of immigrant spouses living legally in the United States from working while waiting on their permanent residency. The extreme backlogs are making families from certain countries struggle, most notably India; current rules cause financial stress over many years and denying the U.S. economy of the talents of these high-skilled future Americans.

References

External links 

The New York Times: The Other Immigration
BusinessWeek: How Skilled Immigrants Found a Voice
The New York Times: US Agency Is Swamped by Requests for Visas
The Washington Post: A Gift From Gandhi
BusinessWeek: Skilled Immigrants' March on Washington
BBC News: Skilled immigrants suffer US limbo

Non-profit organizations based in the United States
Immigration to the United States
501(c)(4) nonprofit organizations